Robert William Fioretti (born March 8, 1953) is an American attorney and politician who served as an alderman in the Chicago City Council for the 2nd Ward, which included portions of Bronzeville, East Garfield Park, Illinois Medical District, Little Italy, Loop, Near West Side, Prairie District, South Loop, University Village, Westhaven, and West Loop. Bob first ran for office because of inequities and disinvestments he saw throughout the City of Chicago and communities of the 2nd Ward. He first won election as alderman in 2007 and was re-elected in 2011. He also served as 2nd Ward Democratic Committeeman for two terms, which is a position in the Cook County Democratic Party.

When ward boundaries were re-drawn after the 2010 Census, the original area in the 2nd ward was divided into several wards, and Fioretti did not run for re-election. Since leaving City Council, Fioretti has run for several other elected offices.

Background/education

Fioretti was born and raised in Chicago's Pullman and Roseland neighborhoods. He is the son of a Polish-American mother and an Italian immigrant father who moved to Chicago and worked for the Pullman train car company. Fioretti attended St. Anthony's Grammar School and Mendel High School on the South Side of Chicago. He received a Pullman Foundation scholarship to attend the University of Illinois, where he studied political science and served as student body president.

Fioretti earned his J.D. degree from Northern Illinois University College of Law, where he remains a member of the adjunct faculty. He serves on the Law School Alumni Council and the NIU Board of Visitors. He previously served as president of the NIU National Alumni Association from 2000 to 2004. During his tenure as president, Fioretti oversaw the establishment of a Chicago alumni office, the formation of a quarterly alumni magazine, and the creation of the Barsema Alumni Center on campus, created the law student travel overseas program, and helped establish a scholarship endowment program. Fioretti also served as president of the NIU College of Law Alumni Council. He has spoken at graduation lauding NIU as an incredible asset to the state of Illinois education and empowering students to become successful professionals in many fields of endeavor. He regularly mentors law school students and underwrites the annual Helene and Edward Fioretti Memorial Scholarship in Ethics in honor of his parents.

Personal life
Fioretti currently lives on Chicago’s Near West Side, with his wife, Nicki.

Fioretti survived throat cancer, which he was diagnosed with in late-2010. In 2019 Fioretti published, "My Cancer Journey: In Seven Parts." Fioretti described the book by stating, "You now belong to a club where no one wants to be a member. Words no one wants to hear. But there is nothing you negotiate to get out of it once it happens to you. My Cancer Journey chronicles what I, and my wife, Nicki, went through from my diagnosis to treatment, recovery and our new normal today."

Legal career
Fioretti, a long-time civil rights lawyer, is currently a partner in the law firm Roth Fioretti LLC in Chicago, where he practices governmental law and complex litigation. He is a seasoned civil litigator and has litigated a wide variety of cases before federal and state administrative law judges as well as in the state and federal courts. He is a former Senior Supervising Attorney of the General Litigation Division for the Corporation Counsel for the City of Chicago, working with Mayor Harold Washington during the time of Council Wars. While there, he was involved in more than 500 civil rights cases, and his personal trail experiences have led to over 100 state and federal verdicts and appellate court decisions. Bob has advised and represented many governmental units. He has been appointed in numerous cases as a Special Assistant Attorney General of Illinois and a Special Assistant State's Attorney.

Long before it was popular, Fioretti fought to free people of color wrongly accused of crimes they did not commit. In 2006 Fioretti was the attorney for LaFonso Rollins, a young African American sentenced to 75 years in jail for rape. Rollins had spent 11 years in prison before being exonerated in 2004 by DNA testing. He was awarded a $9 million settlement in a wrongful conviction lawsuit against the City of Chicago.

He represented the family of Baby Tamia in the high-profile interstate adoption case that led to changes in Illinois adoption law. This high-profile adoption case spurred legislation in Illinois, providing sweeping protections for birth parents and established the state as a model for adoption reform. Previously Illinois adoption law has been discriminatory against poor families of color involved in the adoption process.

Aldermanic career

In 2007, Fioretti ran for Alderman of Chicago's 2nd Ward, challenging 14-year incumbent Madeline Haithcock. He secured the most votes in the February primary and forced a run-off with Haithcock. In the run-off, Fioretti defeated Haithcock, by nearly a two-to-one margin. Fioretti took office on May 21, 2007. In 2011, Fioretti was re-elected to a second term. Following that election, Fioretti's colleagues. along with the Mayor, agreed to a re-districting map that left Fioretti with none of his original ward. Fioretti was one of only two Aldermen to so lose their ward. Fioretti subsequently chose to run for election as Mayor.

Fioretti had come into conflict with mayor Rahm Emanuel many times, including over siding with a successful resistance to Emanuel's efforts to move the water fee exemption for some nonprofits and religious groups in the city's budget and unsuccessfully opposing the licensing of rideshare companies such as Uber and Lyft.

Education and jobs
Since taking office, Fioretti has prioritized education and job creation in his legislative agenda. Fioretti has attempted to improve the Chicago Public School system, working closely with administrators to solve issues both in and out of the classroom. In 2008, Fioretti helped to create "Operation Safe Passage," an initiative designed to protect students on the way to and from school that coordinated the resources of the Chicago Police Department, the CTA, local faith-based institutions, and families. Fioretti supported the expansion of Jones College Prep High School and oversaw Roosevelt University's expansion into Chicago's South Loop. In 2011, Fioretti won the "Defender of Public Education" Award from the Chicago Teachers Union, AFT Local 1 for his efforts at modernizing and sustaining neighborhood schools.

Fioretti has facilitated the creation and preservation of jobs in Chicago. He supported the relocation of the United Airlines headquarters, bringing approximately 2,500 jobs from Elk Grove to Chicago. Fioretti also led the effort to renovate and expand the Chicago Mercantile Exchange to keep the world's largest futures and options exchange as an anchor of Chicago's financial district.

Fioretti has also led efforts to combat the problem of "food deserts" on Chicago's West Side by working to bring low-cost food retailers into previously under-served neighborhoods. Pete's Fresh Market, Target, and Costco have agreed to open new locations within the 2nd Ward, providing food retailers and jobs to West Side residents.

Parks
For his efforts to improve and expand parks in the 2nd Ward, Fioretti received the 2009 "Legislator of the Year" award from Friends of the Parks, a non-profit, Chicago-based park advocacy group. During his tenure as alderman, Fioretti has budgeted city resources to open several new parks in the 2nd Ward.

However, he alienated parks groups when he voted to allow the Chicago Children's Museum to relocate to Grant Park. That move was later challenged in court and Mayor Daley later withdrew the plan and the museum remained at Navy Pier.

Council activities
Fioretti served on five committees in Chicago's city council: Environmental Protection & Public Utilities, Health, License & Consumer Protection, Rules & Ethics, and Special Events.

Pursuits of higher office

Chicago mayoral candidacies 
Fioretti twice ran for Mayor of Chicago. Fioretti had originally been considering a bid for mayor in the 2011 Chicago mayoral election, but canceled these plans after his diagnosis with throat cancer. He would later run in next two mayoral elections (2015 and 2019).

2015 mayoral campaign

Fioretti was an unsuccessful candidate in the 2015 Chicago mayoral election.

Fioretti enjoyed support from former Chicago Bears coach Mike Ditka and withdrawn candidate Amara Enyia, as well as endorsements from the Chicago Police Sergeants Association, the Green Party of Chicago, and the Progressive Caucus of the Chicago City Council.

Fioretti ultimately placed fourth of five candidates in the initial round of the election, with 35,363 votes, equal to 7.39% of the overall vote. Having been eliminated, Fioretti endorsed Rahm Emanuel in the runoff.

2019 mayoral campaign

On November 26, 2018, Fioretti announced his candidacy for mayor in the 2019 election to replace Rahm Emanuel. He was again unsuccessful in his pursuit of Chicago mayoralty. Fioretti placed twelfth of fourteen candidates, with 4,302 votes, equal to 0.77% of the overall vote.

Cook County offices

2018 Cook County Board President campaign

In November 2017, he announced that he would challenge incumbent Toni Preckwinkle for the Democratic nomination for President of the Cook County Board of Commissioners. Fioretti lost to Preckwinkle in the March 20, 2018 Democratic primary.

2020 Cook County State's Attorney campaign

Fioretti was one of several candidates challenging incumbent Cook County State's Attorney Kim Foxx in the 2020 Democratic primary. He confirmed his candidacy to the Chicago Tribune on November 22, 2019, and formally announced his candidacy on December 2, 2019. His candidacy was endorsed by Fraternal Order of Police Chicago Lodge #7. He placed fourth in the primary.

2022 Cook County Board President campaign 

Fioretti ran as the Republican nominee for President of the Cook County Board of Commissioners, once again challenging Preckwinkle, whom he lost to in the 2018 Democratic primary for the seat.

State Senate
In 2016, Fioretti unsuccessfully challenged incumbent Patricia Van Pelt for the Democratic nomination for the 5th district of Illinois Senate. Fioretti once again was defeated by Preckwinkle.

Electoral history

References

External links
 Robert Fioretti Aldermanic website

1953 births
Chicago City Council members
Illinois Democrats
Illinois lawyers
Living people
Northern Illinois University alumni
American people of Italian descent